Jorma can refer to:

Jorma (name), Finnish given name
Jorma (album), released by Kaukonen in 1979
Jorma (wine), a Finnish wine 
nowadays in Finnish language jorma is a very well-known slang word that means penis (similar to dick in colloquial English).